Sigurdur Thorarinsson (Icelandic: Sigurður Þórarinsson) (January 8, 1912 – February 8, 1983) was an Icelandic geologist, volcanologist, glaciologist, professor and lyricist. He is considered a pioneer in the field of tephrochronology, and he made significant contributions in many areas of geology, especially volcanology and glaciology, both in Iceland and abroad.

Biography
Sigurður Þórarinsson was born in Vopnafjörður in northeastern Iceland in 1912. He received his Ph.D. from Stockholm University College in 1944 and began a long and distinguished academic career as professor of geography at the University of Iceland.
According to his obituary in The Geographical Journal, "He was something of a polymath who contrived to take geology, geomorphology, glaciology, climatology, and archaeology in his stride."

He died suddenly of a heart attack in Reykjavík in 1983. Subsequently, the International Association of Volcanology and Chemistry of the Earth's Interior (IAVCEI) decided to name its highest award the Thorarinsson Medal in his honor. As usual outside Iceland, the name of the prize misunderstands Icelandic naming conventions, because Þórarinsson is a patronymic not a surname, and in Iceland he would have properly been referred to by his given first name, Sigurður.

Eldur er í Norðri is a collection of papers, published by his colleague when Sigurður turned 70 years old.

In 1961, he was made a member of the German Academy of Sciences Leopoldina. He was the first to receive the award of Steno Medal in 1969 by the Geological Society of Denmark for his work with volcanology and tephrochronology.

Sigurdur Thorarinsson is the author of the lyrics to many well-known Icelandic songs, such as Þórsmerkurljóð (María María), Vorkvöld í Reykjavík and Að lífið sé skjálfandi.

Bibliography

Books and Theses
 
 
 
Sigurdur Thorarinsson. Surtsey, the new island in the North Atlantic. New York: Viking Press, 1967, 47 pgs text and 53 pgs  photographs.

Selected Significant Articles

References
 
 
 

*

External links
 IAVCEI.org
 'ETT OCH ANNAT OM TEFROKRONOLOGI' -SIGURDUR THORARINSSON

1912 births
1983 deaths
Icelandic volcanologists
Glaciologists
Members of the German Academy of Sciences Leopoldina
Members of the Royal Swedish Academy of Sciences
Sigurdur THorarinsson